Chihlee University of Technology (CLUT), is a private university in Banqiao District, New Taipei, Taiwan. Chihlee serves over 10,000 full-time students. The word zhìlǐ describes a personal quality that may be rendered dedication. CLUT is accredited 
by ACCBE and affiliated with Customs Administration, Ministry of Finance, Importers and Exporters Association of Taipei (IEAT), Customs Broker Association of Kaohsiung, SAP University Alliances and Institute for Innovative Global Education (IIGE).

History 
The school was founded in 1965 in Banqiao as Chihlee College of Business, a trade school offering associate's degrees in fields related to commerce. The CLCB comprised four departments: International Trade, Business Administration, Accounting and Statistics, and Banking and Insurance. A Department of Secretarial Science was added three years later. The school was also known in English as the Chihlee Institute of Commerce.

In 2000 the school was upgraded by Taiwan's Ministry of Education to a full baccalaureate degree-granting institution named Chihlee University of Technology (( factually inaccurate / was still an "Institute" in 2008 / verify dates )). The curriculum and range of majors expanded and the school was renamed Chihlee Institute of Technology. In 2015 the school was officially upgraded by Taiwan's Ministry of Education to a university.

Faculties
 College of Business Management
 College of Innovation and Design
 College of International Business and Foreign Language

Transportation
The campus lies within walking distance of Xinpu Station of Taipei Metro.

See also
 List of universities in Taiwan

References

1965 establishments in Taiwan
Educational institutions established in 1965
Private universities and colleges in Taiwan
Universities and colleges in New Taipei
Universities and colleges in Taiwan
Technical universities and colleges in Taiwan
Banqiao District